The Winter at Tantora Festival is an annual cultural festival held in the old town of Al-'Ula, Medina, located in northwestern Saudi Arabia. The first festival began on 21 December 2018, and was running a series of eight-weekend concerts for world-class musicians. In addition to this, the festival also features other activities and events. The festival's second edition began on 19  December 2019, and a third edition is currently in the works.

Name 
The name of the festival 'Tantora' is inspired by a sundial located in the old town of Al-'Ula, used by the locals as a marker for the changing of the seasons.

Events 2018-2019 Festival 

 Concerts : The first edition of the festival hosted the Italian singer Andrea Bocceli, the Greek composer Yanni and the French violinist Renaud Capuçon.
 Hot air balloon festival.
 Light and Life celebration.
 Fursan Endurance Horse Race, 2 February 2019

Events 2019-2020 Festival 
 Concerts
 Hot air balloon festival
 Fursan Endurance Horse Race

See also 

 Tourism in Saudi Arabia

References 

Music festivals in Saudi Arabia
Annual events in Saudi Arabia
Tourism in Saudi Arabia
Tourist attractions in Saudi Arabia